The Convention of Baptist Churches in Guatemala is a Baptist Christian denomination in Guatemala. It is affiliated with the Baptist World Alliance. The headquarters is in Guatemala City.

History
The Convention of Baptist Churches in Guatemala has its origins in an American mission of the International Mission Board in 1946.  It is officially founded that same year.  According to a denomination census released in 2020, it claimed 845 churches and 72,000 members.

See also
 Bible
 Born again
 Baptist beliefs
 Worship service (evangelicalism)
 Jesus Christ
 Believers' Church

References

External links
 Official Website

Baptist denominations in Central America
Baptist Christianity in Guatemala